Reventin-Vaugris is a commune in the Isère department in southeastern France.

Located 6 km (4½ m) south of the Roman town of Vienne, Reventin-Vaugris is well known because of the toll barrier on the A7 motorway that allows thousands of people going southward to the Mediterranean coast.

Population

Twin towns
Reventin-Vaugris is twinned with:

  Bodrogkeresztúr, Hungary, since 2006

See also
Communes of the Isère department

References

Communes of Isère
Isère communes articles needing translation from French Wikipedia